Backbench may refer to:

 Backbencher, an elected politician in a parliamentary system who is not a cabinet member
 Backbench (comics), a Canadian political comic strip
 Backbencher (magazine), Indian youth magazine